Louis Burstein (1878 – March 25, 1923), sometimes credited as Louis Burston, was a film producer. He co-founded Vim Comedy Company. He was born in Russia.

He led Vim and King-Bee filming operations in Jacksonville, Florida.

Burstein died on March 25, 1923. He had been driving a car and racing a Southern Pacific train near Pomona, California, when the road curved and the train struck his car. One of his passengers, Thomas Truxton Strain, died; the other, Grace A. Farr, was injured.

Selected filmography
The Other Girl (film)
Bright and Early (1918)

References

External links

1878 births
1923 deaths
Emigrants from the Russian Empire to the United States
American film production company founders
Road incident deaths in California
Film producers from California